Pleiospilos simulans (liver plant, split rock plant) is a species of flowering plant in the family Aizoaceae, once endemic to the Eastern Cape of South Africa. Known populations of the plant in the wild are now extinct due its collection as an ornamental plant for succulent collectors. It is a small, low-growing, perennial with succulent leaves and orange or yellow many-petaled flowers.

References

 African Plant Database
 Tropicos

Flora of South Africa
simulans
Taxa named by N. E. Brown
Taxa named by Rudolf Marloth